Smrt fašizmu (trans. Death to fascism) is the second studio album by the Yugoslav/Bosnian band Plavi orkestar, released in 1986. To date, it has been certified diamond, selling over 300,000 copies in the former Yugoslavia.

Track listing
All songs by Saša Lošić

Side A
 "Fa, fa fašista nemoj biti ti (jerbo ću te ja draga ubiti)"
 "Mangup"
 "Jovanka"
 "To je šok"
 "Puteru, puteru"
 "Sava tiho teče"

Side B
 "Ustani, voljena sejo"
 "Zelene su bile oči te"
 "Valcer"
 "U Jevrema slika ta"
 "Nisam je probudio"
 "Kad si sam, druže moj"
 "Kada plaču grlice"

External links
Smrt fašizmu at Discogs

1986 albums
Plavi orkestar albums